Tamyra Mariama Mensah-Stock (born October 11, 1992,  Mensah) is an American wrestler who competes in women's freestyle wrestling. She won the gold medal at the Tokyo Olympics on August 3, 2021, and became the first black woman to win gold in women's freestyle wrestling.

Early life and education 
Tamyra was born in Chicago, Illinois, and grew up in the suburbs of Houston, Texas. Her father was a Ghanaian who lived in Ghana until the age of 30, and her mother is from Illinois.

At Morton Ranch High School in Katy, Texas, her twin sister, Tarkyia, joined the wrestling team their freshman year while Tamyra pursued track and field. She joined the wrestling team her sophomore year, at age 15, after her sister and the wrestling coach, Mark Balser, convinced her to take part in a wrestling practice session. However, she almost quit after her father's fatal car accident, on his way home from one of her high school wrestling matches. She blamed wrestling for her father's untimely death. She saw him as her biggest supporter.

In 2010 and 2011, she became the Texas High School Girls Champion having finished second in 2009. In 2010, she became the U.S. Junior National runner-up.

After high school, she attended Wayland Baptist University (WBU) where she earned a Bachelor’s Degree in Exercise and Sports Science. As a student wrestler, she became the Women's Collegiate Wrestling Association (WCWA) Nationals Champion in 2014 and 2017. She also took third place in the 2013 at the U.S. Universities Championship and first place in 2015.

Career
Although she won the 68 kg class at the 2016 U.S. Olympic Trials, none of the athletes from the United States secured a spot to compete in relevant 68 kg weight category at the 2016 Rio Olympics, so she spent her time in Brazil as a practice partner for teammates who were eligible in other weight categories.

She won the gold medal in the women's 68 kg event during the 2019 World Wrestling Championships and also qualified to represent United States at the 2020 Summer Olympics. She was one of the three gold medalists for the United States in women's freestyle category at the 2019 World Championships, which also marked the first instance where U.S. delegation claimed three gold medals in women's wrestling event at a single World Championships.

Tamyra also claimed a bronze medal in the women's 68 kg event at the 2018 World Wrestling Championships.

In January 2021, she won the gold medal in the women's 68 kg event at the Grand Prix de France Henri Deglane 2021 held in Nice, France. She also won the gold medal in the 68 kg event at the Matteo Pellicone Ranking Series 2021 held in Rome, Italy.

On August 3, 2021, she won the gold medal in the women's freestyle 68 kg, after defeating Nigeria's Blessing Oborududu 4–1, at the 2020 Summer Olympics. She became the first female African-American and the first Black wrestler to win Olympic gold, and only the second female American to win gold, after Helen Maroulis in 2016. Two months after the Olympics, she won one of the bronze medals in the women's 68 kg event at the 2021 World Wrestling Championships in Oslo, Norway.

She won the gold medal in her event at the 2022 Tunis Ranking Series event held in Tunis, Tunisia.

Personal life 
In 2016, Mensah-Stock married Jacob Stock, who wrestled alongside his future wife at Morton Ranch High School and at Wayland Baptist University. Mensah-Stock is a pescatarian.

References

External links 
 
 
 

1992 births
Living people
American female sport wrestlers
American sportspeople of Ghanaian descent
World Wrestling Championships medalists
Pan American Games gold medalists for the United States
Pan American Games medalists in wrestling
People from Katy, Texas
Wrestlers at the 2019 Pan American Games
Medalists at the 2019 Pan American Games
Pan American Wrestling Championships medalists
Wrestlers at the 2020 Summer Olympics
Medalists at the 2020 Summer Olympics
Olympic gold medalists for the United States in wrestling
African-American sportswomen
African-American sport wrestlers
Wayland Baptist Pioneers athletes
21st-century African-American sportspeople
21st-century African-American women